The Grammy Award for Best Female R&B Vocal Performance (previously called Best Rhythm and Blues Solo Vocal Performance, Female) was an honor presented at the Grammy Awards, a ceremony established in 1958 and originally called the Gramophone Awards, to female recording artists for quality R&B songs. Awards in several categories are distributed annually  by the National Academy of Recording Arts and Sciences of the United States to "honor artistic achievement, technical proficiency  and overall excellence in the recording industry, without regard to album sales or chart position."

According to the category description guide for the 52nd Grammy Awards, the award was presented to artists that performed "newly recorded solo R&B vocal performances". Solo numbers by members of an established group were not eligible for the award as "separate entries from the duo or group performances." Albums were also considered for the accolade until 1992.

As a part of the major overhaul of Grammy categories, the award was discontinued in 2011. The Female R&B Vocal Performance category, Male R&B Vocal Performance category and all duo/group vocal performances in the R&B category shifted to the Best R&B Performance category in 2012.

The award for the Best Female R&B Vocal Performance was first presented to Aretha Franklin at the 10th Grammy Awards ceremony in 1968 for the song "Respect". Franklin received the most wins with eleven, followed by Anita Baker with five. Franklin also holds the record for the most nominations with twenty-three, while Chaka Khan is second with eight nominations. Fantasia Barrino became the final recipient of the award, when her song "Bittersweet" won the award in 2011. The award was presented to artists from the United States each year.

Recipients

 Each year is linked to the article about the Grammy Awards held that year.

See also

 List of artists who reached number one on the Billboard R&B chart
 List of Grammy Award categories
 List of number-one rhythm and blues hits (United States)

References

General
  Note: User must select the "R&B" category as the genre under the search feature.

Specific

External links
Official site of the Grammy Awards

Awards disestablished in 2011
Female RandB Vocal Performance
Grammy Awards for rhythm and blues
1968 establishments in the United States
Music awards honoring women